Shanghai Disneyland (Pinyin: Shànghǎi díshìní lèyuán) is a theme park located in Chuansha New Town, Pudong, Shanghai, China, that is part of the Shanghai Disney Resort. The park is operated by Disney Parks, Experiences and Products and Shanghai Shendi Group, through a joint venture between The Walt Disney Company and Shendi. Construction began on April 8, 2011.  The park opened on June 16, 2016. The park operated in its first half-year with a visitor attendance of 5.60 million guests.

The park currently has seven themed areas: Mickey Avenue, Gardens of Imagination, Fantasyland, Treasure Cove, Adventure Isle, Tomorrowland, and Toy Story Land.

History

Preparations

The Chinese government approved the resort on November 4, 2009. The Walt Disney Company announced on November 5, 2010, that it had signed an agreement with Shanghai Shendi Group to build the resort and park in Shanghai, with a planned opening in 2015. On April 7, 2011, groundbreaking began at the Shanghai Disneyland Resort site. On June 29, 2013, construction on the Enchanted Storybook Castle began.

Construction
Major construction work started on April 8, 2011, targeting a spring 2016 opening. The project is financed by several large Chinese state-owned enterprises in Shanghai forming a joint venture with the Walt Disney Company. "The first-phase of the project will be to the South of Huanglou Area, an area in Chuansha Town, the southeast suburbs of Shanghai's Pudong area; the second phase will extend further southwest," an urban developer from Shanghai stated. DeSimone Consulting Engineers were the structural engineers behind the construction work.

On March 8, 2013, the company announced that the park would open in late 2015. On February 2, 2015, the opening date was pushed back to early 2016. On January 12, 2016, the park's opening date was announced as June 16, 2016, its final opening date.

The cost was initially estimated at 24.5 billion yuan (US$3.7 billion) for the theme park and an additional 4.5 billion yuan (US$700 million). That rose to around US$5.5 billion before delays, which was partly due to more attractions opening to the public on the first day, which added US$800 million to the cost.

In addition to the attractions and two hotels, a high-speed rail system is being built to get visitors to and from the site.

Disney owns 43% of the property, and the state-controlled Shanghai Shendi Group owns the remaining 57%.

Opening
On May 7, 2016, Shanghai Disneyland had started soft openings.

Disney aired the live broadcast of the grand opening show on its Facebook and the Disney TV stations on the night of June 15, 2016. Bob Iger, the chairman and chief executive officer of The Walt Disney Company, was joined by nearly 3,000 distinguished guests and celebrities for a showcase of choreography, acrobatics, costumes, and technology on grand scale, with dazzling lights, Disney music, pageantry, special effects, and fireworks. The show featured world-renowned pianist Lang Lang, who performed a custom arrangement of the musical sensation "Let It Go" (from Disney's Frozen) and China's television and actress Sun Li took center stage. The historic event included the debut of an original song, "Ignite the Dreamer Within", written especially for the grand opening of Shanghai Disneyland. Acclaimed composer and conductor Tan Dun, widely known for his stirring scores for the films Crouching Tiger, Hidden Dragon and Hero, led the Shanghai Symphony with an original composition of the new song.

As the opening was met with rainy weather, Chinese Vice Premier Wang Yang told Iger that the rain is an auspicious sign of dollars and renminbi to come. Wang then read a brief message of congratulations from Chinese leader Xi Jinping, who said: "By adding to the classic Disney style a stroke of Chinese characteristics, and by blending international standards with best local practices, the resort demonstrates our commitment to cross-cultural cooperation."

Ticket pricing

Tickets for the park went on sale on March 28, 2016, with a two-tiered pricing scheme. On most days, day adult tickets will be , while child and elderly one-day tickets will cost , roughly 20% cheaper than Hong Kong Disneyland (which charges  for a day adult ticket). During busier periods, including the first two weeks of the park's operation, adult day tickets will cost , while child and elderly tickets will cost . The park will be the first Disney park to feature tiered pricing.

According to the International Business Times (IBT), the equivalent of park ticket pricing will cost about US$75 for adults and US$60 for children on holidays and weekends, and around US$60 for adults and US$45 for children on weekdays. IBT notes that "a two-day weekend ticket for two adults and one child comes close to China's average urban monthly wage."

Opening day tickets sold out in a few hours after they had gone on sale at midnight, March 28. However, more tickets were put on sale several days before the official opening day.

In addition to the day pass option, there is also an annual pass option. For those who visit the park regularly, an annual pass is a more sensible option than a day pass.

Response to COVID-19 
In response to the COVID-19 pandemic, the park (which was the first Disney park to close) temporarily closed from January 25, 2020, following the actions of Ocean Park Hong Kong and Hong Kong Disneyland Park. It remained closed the following three and a half months, reopening to guests on May 11, 2020, becoming the first of the Disney Parks to reopen. It reopened under strict rules that included, but was not limited to, social distancing, reduced capacity, temperature screenings, and mandatory face masks. Shanghai Disney Resort closed for a second time due to an increase in COVID-19 cases in China from March 21, 2022, through June 29, 2022. The resort reopened for the second time on June 30, 2022. On October 31, 2022, it was announced that the park would once again close indefinitely due to a surge in cases.
It last closed on November 29, 2022, before reopening again on December 8 after China eased its "zero COVID" policy in response to protests.

Dedication

Park layout and attractions 

Upon the company's promise that the Shanghai resort would be "authentically Disney and distinctly Chinese," Chinese architects and designers and teams of researchers were hired to find ways to incorporate Chinese cultural elements. Many usual Disney park features have been redesigned or are absent from Shanghai Disneyland to cater for Chinese visitors' preferences. The park does not feature a steam railroad surrounding the park's perimeter and has no earthen berm to obscure the outside world from guest view. As a replacement for a central-spoked/hub, the center of the park features a  collection of Chinese zodiac gardens called the Gardens of Imagination. Main Street U.S.A. has given way to Mickey Avenue, which introduces Chinese visitors to Disney characters. Conventional-themed lands such as Adventureland are reimagined into Adventure Isle, and other lands, such as Frontierland, are omitted entirely. Several staple attractions, such as Space Mountain, Jungle Cruise, and It's a Small World, are excluded as Disney wanted to avoid criticism of cultural imperialism. Restaurant seating has been revised upwards after studies found that Chinese guests take longer over meals, and extensive picnic areas are better adapted to extended families with grandparents. Also, there is more live entertainment as many Chinese patrons prefer that to thrill rides.

In regards to the layout of other Magic Kingdom parks, this park's layout is mirrored. Instead of being on the left side of main hub, Adventure Isle (Adventureland) is on the right side; while as Tomorrowland is now on the left side instead of the right. Fantasyland is located in the back behind the castle (Enchanted Storybook Castle).

Mickey Avenue

Mickey Avenue, the entrance of the park, is the park's equivalent to Main Street, U.S.A. The area is inspired by the personalities of Disney cartoon characters such as Mickey Mouse, Minnie Mouse, Donald Duck, and Chip 'n' Dale as well as Disney films, including Ratatouille, The Three Caballeros, and Lady and the Tramp. Avenue M Arcade, the largest gift shop in the park, is modeled after the Carthay Circle Theater. The Storytellers statue, which depicts a young Walt Disney and Mickey Mouse, is at the end of Mickey Avenue and in front of the Gardens of Imagination.

Gardens of Imagination
The hub of the park, this land features seven  Chinese gardens with each of the twelve animals of the Chinese zodiac represented by Disney characters. Attractions include Dumbo the Flying Elephant, Fantasia Carousel, and Marvel Super Heroes at Marvel Universe, a meet-and-greet pavilion featuring Marvel characters. Entertainment includes castle stage shows as well as the nightly Ignite the Dream, A Nighttime Spectacular of Magic and Light. Mickey's Storybook Express, a parade with a musical soundtrack and colorful performers, runs on the longest parade route in a Disney park.

Fantasyland

Fantasyland is the park's largest land themed to Disney animated films. The land features the  Enchanted Storybook Castle, themed to Disney princesses. The castle is the largest in any Disney theme park and features the Royal Banquet Hall restaurant, a boutique, and Voyage to the Crystal Grotto, a boat ride around and under the castle that takes guests past scenes from films including Tangled, Aladdin, Mulan, Fantasia, The Little Mermaid and Beauty and the Beast. Attractions include Seven Dwarfs Mine Train, Peter Pan's Flight, The Many Adventures of Winnie the Pooh, For the First Time in Forever: A Frozen Sing-Along Celebration, Alice's Curious Labyrinth, a walk-through hedge maze inspired by the 1951 and 2010 versions film adaptations, and the Hunny Pot Spin, a spinning Teacups-style ride themed to The Many Adventures of Winnie the Pooh.

Treasure Cove

Treasure Cove is themed to an 18th-century Spanish harbor town located on a Caribbean island that has been captured by Captain Jack Sparrow from Pirates of the Caribbean. The land's marquee attraction is Pirates of the Caribbean: Battle for the Sunken Treasure, a dark ride based on the films. Guests, riding in magnetically propelled boats, travel past audio-animatronic and projected depictions of Jack Sparrow and Davy Jones as the two battle against each other in attempt to seize the cove's sunken riches.

The land also is home to Eye of the Storm: Captain Jack’s Stunt Spectacular, a stunt show inspired by the films and Siren's Revenge, a shipwreck-themed three-story interactive play area set aboard a wrecked French galleon. Explorer Canoes are also located in this area.

Adventure Isle

Adventure Isle is the park's counterpart to Adventureland. Focused around a mysterious lost world full of hidden treasures, the land features Roaring Rapids, a river rapids ride through the land's towering Roaring Mountain and Soaring Over the Horizon, a hang gliding flight experience across the world. Additionally, the land features Tarzan: Call of the Jungle, a live acrobatic stage show, and Camp Discovery.

Tomorrowland

Tomorrowland is the park's futuristic-themed land. Unlike the other Tomorrowlands, this version does not have Space Mountain and instead is home to TRON Lightcycle Power Run, an indoor Tron-themed roller coaster. Similarly, instead of an Astro Orbiter attraction, Shanghai's park includes a spinning Jet Packs ride. Other attractions include Tomorrowland Pavilion (home to Star Wars Launch Bay, which is permanently closed to make way for Avatar: Explorer Pandora), Stitch Encounter, and Buzz Lightyear Planet Rescue, a variant of previous Buzz Lightyear dark rides.

Toy Story Land

This Toy Story franchise-themed land, the park's first expansion, opened on April 26, 2018. The original plans for Shanghai Disneyland called for a Toy Story area with three rides, two restaurants, a show, and a gift shop. The Celebration Café, a restaurant that opened on opening day, was meant to be in Toy Story Land. Additionally, the nearby bathrooms are the same as the Toy Story Green Army Men attractions found at the other parks.

Upcoming areas

City of Zootopia 
Announced on January 22, 2019, an eighth themed land named City of Zootopia, based on the animated film Zootopia, would be coming to the park. To be located beside Fantasyland, it will be the first Zootopia-themed area at any Disney park around the world. The new land will feature a major attraction with highly advanced technology to bring the movie to life. There will also be entertainment, merchandise, and F&B offerings. It will open in 2023.

Attendance

See also
Shanghai Disney Resort
Hong Kong Disneyland

References

External links

Shanghai Disneyland Website

 
2016 establishments in China
Amusement parks opened in 2016
Walt Disney Parks and Resorts
Amusement parks in Shanghai
Pudong